Solo flight may refer to:

 First solo flight of a student pilot
 Solo Flight (video game), a 1983 flight simulator game for the Commodore 64 and Atari 8-bit family
 Solo Flight (Laurence Juber album), 1990
 Solo Flight (Charlie Byrd album), 1964
 "Solo Flight" (composition), a 1941 instrumental song by Benny Goodman and His Orchestra
 Solo Flight: The Genius of Charlie Christian, a 1972 album
 Solo Flight (Ray Bryant album), 1977

See also
 Solo Flights, a 1968 album by Chet Atkins